Secundino Salvador Eyama Nsi Eyanga (born 14 February 2000), sportingly known as Amor, is an Equatorial Guinean footballer who plays as a forward for Spanish club CD Valdepeñas and the Equatorial Guinea national team.

Career statistics

International

International goals
Scores and results list Equatorial Guinea's goal tally first.

Personal life
Amor's brother, José Antonio Mba (known as Cielo), is also a footballer. He is nicknamed Amor (English: Love) because he was born on Valentine's Day.

References

2000 births
Living people
Sportspeople from Malabo
Equatoguinean footballers
Association football forwards
Equatorial Guinea international footballers
Cano Sport Academy players
Equatoguinean expatriate footballers
Equatoguinean expatriate sportspeople in Spain
Expatriate footballers in Spain
Equatorial Guinea A' international footballers
2018 African Nations Championship players